An odalisque was a female slave of a Turkish harem.

Odalisque may also refer to:
Odalisque (novel) – a novel by Fiona McIntosh
 Odalisque – part of Quicksilver (novel) by Neal Stephenson, later published as a separate novel
Odalisque with Raised Arms – a painting by Henri Matisse
Odalisque (painting) – a painting by Filipino painter and revolutionary activist Juan Luna
Grande Odalisque, also known as Une Odalisque or La Grande Odalisque – a painting by Jean Auguste Dominique Ingres
 Odalisque, a song on the Decemberists' album Castaways and Cutouts
 The Odalisque (Fortuny) – a painting by Marià Fortuny conserved in the National Museum of Art of Catalonia, in Barcelona

Medusa vs Odalisque – a fictional film in the novel Infinite Jest